The Admont Abbey Library (Deutsch: Stiftsbibliothek Admont) is an Austria-based monastic library located in Admont, a small town next to the Enns River in Austria, and is attached to the Admont Abbey.

Admont Abbey Library is the largest monastic library in the world, and is noted for its Baroque art, architecture and manuscripts.

History
Admont Abbey Library, modelled on the Imperial Court Library in Vienna, was designed by Josef Hueber. Construction of the library began in 1074 and was completed in 1776.

References

Monastic libraries
Libraries in Austria
Libraries established in 1776